The 2010–11 Detroit Pistons season was the 70th season of the franchise, the 63rd in the National Basketball Association (NBA), and the 54th in the Detroit area.

NBA Draft 2010

Draft picks

Roster

Pre-season

Game log

|- bgcolor="#ffcccc"
| 1
| October 5
| @ Miami
| 
| Ben Gordon (17)
| Ben Gordon,Charlie Villanueva (5)
| Rodney Stuckey (5)
| American Airlines Arena19,600
| 0–1
|- bgcolor="#ccffcc"
| 2
| October 8
| Milwaukee
| 
| Austin Daye (21)
| Austin Daye (7)
| Will Bynum (9)
| The Palace of Auburn Hills12,821
| 1–1
|- bgcolor="#ccffcc"
| 3
| October 11
| Atlanta
| 
| Rodney Stuckey (16)
| Greg Monroe (7)
| Richard Hamilton (7)
| The Palace of Auburn Hills10,591
| 2–1
|- bgcolor="#ffcccc"
| 4
| October 13
| Dallas
| 
| Austin Daye (16)
| Ben Wallace,Jason Maxiell (8)
| Rodney Stuckey (6)
| Van Andel Arena10,207
| 2–2
|- bgcolor="#ffcccc"
| 5
| October 15
| @ Minnesota
| 
| Austin Daye (18)
| Austin Daye (11)
| Will Bynum (5)
| Carrier Dome11,747
| 2–3
|- bgcolor="#ffcccc"
| 6
| October 16
| @ Charlotte
| 
| Rodney Stuckey (25)
| Greg Monroe (8)
| Rodney Stuckey,Will Bynum (5)
| Colonial Life Arena6,847
| 2–4
|- bgcolor="#ccffcc"
| 7
| October 19
| Washington
| 
| Rodney Stuckey (34)
| Ben Wallace (11)
| Rodney Stuckey (7)
| Huntington Center6,424
| 3–4
|- bgcolor="#ffcccc"
| 8
| October 22
| Memphis
| 
| Austin Daye (22)
| Ben Wallace (8)
| Rodney Stuckey (7)
| The Palace of Auburn Hills18,528
| 3–5
|-

Regular season

Standings

Record vs. opponents

* – Division leader 
x – Clinched playoffs 
y – Division leader

Game log

|- bgcolor="#ffcccc"
| 1
| October 27
| @ New Jersey
| 
| Tayshaun Prince,Rodney Stuckey,Charlie Villanueva (14)
| Ben Wallace (10)
| Rodney Stuckey (7)
| Prudential Center15,178
| 0–1
|- bgcolor="#ffcccc"
| 2
| October 29					
| Oklahoma City
| 
| Ben Gordon (32)
| Ben Wallace (8)
| Rodney Stuckey (9)
| The Palace of Auburn Hills22,076
| 0–2
|- bgcolor="#ffcccc"
| 3
| October 30
| @ Chicago
| 
| Ben Gordon (21)
| Ben Wallace (13)
| Rodney Stuckey (7)
| United Center21,038
| 0–3
|-

|- bgcolor="#ffcccc"
| 4
| November 2
| Boston
| 
| Charlie Villanueva (17)
| Ben Wallace (8)
| Ben Gordon (4)
| The Palace of Auburn Hills15,313
| 0–4
|- bgcolor="#ffcccc"
| 5
| November 3
| @ Atlanta
| 
| Ben Gordon (22)
| Greg Monroe (8)
| Ben Gordon (4)
| Philips Arena13,003
| 0–5
|- bgcolor="#ccffcc"
| 6
| November 5
| Charlotte
| 
| Ben Gordon (20)
| Ben Wallace,Greg Monroe (6)
| Ben Wallace (4)
| The Palace of Auburn Hills13,291
| 1–5
|- bgcolor="#ccffcc"
| 7
| November 7
| Golden State
| 
| Richard Hamilton (27)
| Charlie Villanueva (10)
| Rodney Stuckey (9)
| The Palace of Auburn Hills12,813
| 2–5
|- bgcolor="#ffcccc"
| 8
| November 9
| @ Portland
| 
| Rodney Stuckey (17)
| Austin Daye (8)
| Richard Hamilton (4)
| Rose Garden20,556
| 2–6
|- bgcolor="#ccffcc"
| 9
| November 12
| @ L.A. Clippers
| 
| Charlie Villanueva (30)
| Tayshaun Prince (8)
| Rodney Stuckey (6)
| Staples Center16,960
| 3–6
|- bgcolor="#ccffcc"
| 10
| November 14
| @ Sacramento
| 
| Rodney Stuckey (17)
| Ben Wallace (10)
| Rodney Stuckey (7)
| ARCO Arena12,377
| 4–6
|- bgcolor="#ffcccc"
| 11
| November 15
| @ Golden State
| 
| Charlie Villanueva (18)
| Rodney Stuckey,Charlie Villanueva (8)
| Rodney Stuckey (6)
| Oracle Arena19,123
| 4–7
|- bgcolor="#ffcccc"
| 12
| November 17
| L.A. Lakers
| 
| Rodney Stuckey (18)
| Ben Wallace (8)
| Ben Gordon (7)
| The Palace of Auburn Hills20,284
| 4–8
|- bgcolor="#ccffcc"
| 13
| November 21
| Washington
| 
| Richard Hamilton (27)
| Charlie Villanueva (11)
| Rodney Stuckey (7)
| The Palace of Auburn Hills13,241
| 5–8
|- bgcolor="#ffcccc"
| 14
| November 23
| @ Dallas
| 
| Tayshaun Prince,Rodney Stuckey (19)
| Greg Monroe (8)
| Tracy McGrady (4)
| American Airlines Center19,734
| 5–9
|- bgcolor="#ffcccc"
| 15
| November 24
| @ Memphis
| 
| Rodney Stuckey (17)
| Greg Monroe (8)
| Tracy McGrady (4)
| FedExForum11,283
| 5–10
|- bgcolor="#ccffcc"
| 16
| November 26
| Milwaukee
| 
| Rodney Stuckey (18)
| Charlie Villanueva,Ben Wallace (8)
| Richard Hamilton (9)
| The Palace of Auburn Hills17,133
| 6–10
|- bgcolor="#ffcccc"
| 17
| November 28
| New York
| 
| Tayshaun Prince (31)
| Tayshaun Prince (8)
| Tayshaun Prince (7)
| The Palace of Auburn Hills16,015
| 6–11
|- bgcolor="#ffcccc"
| 18
| November 30
| @ Orlando
| 
| Tayshaun Prince (16)
| Ben Wallace (9)
| Rodney Stuckey (5)
| Amway Center18,846
| 6–12
|-

|- bgcolor="#ffcccc"
| 19
| December 1
| @ Miami
| 
| Greg Monroe (15)
| Greg Monroe (8)
| Will Bynum,Ben Gordon,Richard Hamilton,Tayshaun Prince (2)
| American Airlines Arena19,600
| 6–13
|- bgcolor="#ffcccc"
| 20
| December 3
| Orlando
| 
| Tayshaun Prince (30)
| Ben Gordon (9)
| Rodney Stuckey (7)
| The Palace of Auburn Hills18,433
| 6–14
|- bgcolor="#ccffcc"
| 21
| December 5
| Cleveland
| 
| Richard Hamilton (27)
| Ben Wallace (9)
| Rodney Stuckey (11)
| The Palace of Auburn Hills13,081
| 7–14
|- bgcolor="#ffcccc"
| 22
| December 7
| @ Houston
| 
| Rodney Stuckey (18)
| Tayshaun Prince,Ben Wallace (8)
| Rodney Stuckey (5)
| Toyota Center14,798
| 7–15
|- bgcolor="#ffcccc"
| 23
| December 8
| @ New Orleans
| 
| Ben Gordon (19)
| Ben Wallace (7)
| Tracy McGrady (3)
| New Orleans Arena10,823
| 7–16
|- bgcolor="#ffcccc"
| 24
| December 10
| @ Minnesota
| 
| Richard Hamilton (26)
| Greg Monroe (15)
| Rodney Stuckey (6)
| Target Center13,988
| 7–17
|- bgcolor="#ffcccc"
| 25
| December 11
| Toronto
| 
| Rodney Stuckey,Ben Wallace (23)
| Ben Wallace (14)
| Rodney Stuckey (12)
| The Palace of Auburn Hills13,343
| 7–18
|- bgcolor="#ccffcc"
| 26
| December 14
| Atlanta
| 
| Richard Hamilton (24)
| Charlie Villanueva (11)
| Rodney Stuckey (10)
| The Palace of Auburn Hills12,526
| 8–18
|- bgcolor="#ffcccc"
| 27
| December 17
| L.A. Clippers
| 
| Charlie Villanueva (18)
| Charlie Villanueva (9)
| Tracy McGrady (5)
| The Palace of Auburn Hills16,046
| 8–19
|- bgcolor="#ccffcc"
| 28
| December 19
| New Orleans
| 
| Tayshaun Prince (28)
| Tayshaun Prince (12)
| Will Bynum (9)
| The Palace of Auburn Hills16,452
| 9–19
|- bgcolor="#ccffcc"
| 29
| December 22
| @ Toronto
| 
| Richard Hamilton (35)
| Tracy McGrady (7)
| Tracy McGrady (7)
| Air Canada Centre15,303
| 10–19
|- bgcolor="#ffcccc"
| 30
| December 26
| Chicago
| 
| Tayshaun Prince (17)
| Charlie Villanueva (10)
| Tayshaun Prince (6)
| The Palace of Auburn Hills20,765
| 10–20
|- bgcolor="#ffcccc"
| 31
| December 27
| @ Charlotte
| 
| Charlie Villanueva (25)
| Chris Wilcox (8)
| Will Bynum (7)
| Time Warner Cable Arena14,418
| 10–21
|- bgcolor="#ccffcc"
| 32
| December 29
| Boston
| 
| Tracy McGrady (21)
| Chris Wilcox (8)
| Tracy McGrady (8)
| The Palace of Auburn Hills22,076
| 11–21
|- bgcolor="#ffcccc"
| 33
| December 31
| @ Phoenix
| 
| Ben Gordon (19)
| Austin Daye (8)
| Ben Gordon,Tayshaun Prince (3)
| US Airways Center17,637
| 11–22
|-

|- bgcolor="#ffcccc"
| 34
| January 3
| @ Utah
| 
| Tayshaun Prince (26)
| Tracy McGrady (9)
| Tracy McGrady (11)
| EnergySolutions Arena19,911
| 11–23
|- bgcolor="#ffcccc"
| 35
| January 4
| @ L.A. Lakers
| 
| Tracy McGrady,Greg Monroe (14)
| Greg Monroe (11)
| Tracy McGrady (6)
| Staples Center18,997
| 11–24
|- bgcolor="#ccffcc"
| 36
| January 8
| Philadelphia
| 
| Tayshaun Prince (23)
| Greg Monroe (13)
| Tracy McGrady (7)
| The Palace of Auburn Hills20,038
| 12–24
|- bgcolor="#ffcccc"
| 37
| January 10
| @ Chicago
| 
| Tayshaun Prince (15)
| Greg Monroe (11)
| Rodney Stuckey (4)
| United Center21,407
| 12–25
|- bgcolor="#ffcccc"
| 38
| January 12
| Memphis
| 
| Ben Gordon (25)
| Greg Monroe (11)
| Rodney Stuckey (6)
| The Palace of Auburn Hills13,068
| 12–26
|- bgcolor="#ccffcc"
| 39
| January 14
| @ Toronto
| 
| Tracy McGrady (22)
| Chris Wilcox (12)
| Tracy McGrady (5)
| Air Canada Centre16,924
| 13–26
|- bgcolor="#ccffcc"
| 40
| January 15
| Sacramento
| 
| Tayshaun Prince (21)
| Greg Monroe (7)
| Will Bynum (7)
| The Palace of Auburn Hills18,784
| 14–26
|- bgcolor="#ccffcc"
| 41
| January 17
| Dallas
| 
| Rodney Stuckey (20)
| Greg Monroe (9)
| Rodney Stuckey (6)
| The Palace of Auburn Hills12,660
| 15–26
|- bgcolor="#ffcccc"
| 42
| January 19
| @ Boston
| 
| Rodney Stuckey (15)
| Greg Monroe (9)
| Tracy McGrady (7)
| TD Garden18,624
| 15–27
|- bgcolor="#ffcccc"
| 43
| January 21
| @ New Jersey
| 
| Tayshaun Prince (16)
| Greg Monroe (10)
| Tracy McGrady (6)
| Prudential Center13,316
| 15–28
|- bgcolor="#ccffcc"
| 44
| January 22
| Phoenix
| 
| Tayshaun Prince (17)
| Tayshaun Prince (13)
| Tayshaun Prince (5)
| The Palace of Auburn Hills21,326
| 16–28
|- bgcolor="#ccffcc"
| 45
| January 24
| @ Orlando
| 
| Austin Daye,Tracy McGrady,Tayshaun Prince (20)
| Ben Wallace (11)
| Tayshaun Prince (6)
| Amway Center19,098
| 17–28
|- bgcolor="#ffcccc"
| 46
| January 26
| Denver
| 
| Will Bynum (19)
| Ben Wallace (10)
| Tracy McGrady (8)
| The Palace of Auburn Hills16,212
| 17–29
|- bgcolor="#ffcccc"
| 47
| January 28
| @ Miami
| 
| Ben Gordon (21)
| Chris Wilcox (10)
| Tracy McGrady (10)
| American Airlines Arena19,805
| 17–30
|- bgcolor="#ffcccc"
| 48
| January 30
| @ New York
| 
| Ben Gordon (35)
| Greg Monroe (17)
| Chris Wilcox (4)
| Madison Square Garden19,763
| 17–31
|-

|- bgcolor="#ffcccc"
| 49
| February 2
| Charlotte
| 
| Ben Gordon (20)
| Greg Monroe (8)
| Tracy McGrady (8)
| The Palace of Auburn Hills14,376
| 17–32
|- bgcolor="#ccffcc"
| 50
| February 4
| New Jersey
| 
| Tayshaun Prince (22)
| Greg Monroe (11)
| Ben Gordon,Tracy McGrady,Tayshaun Prince (4)
| The Palace of Auburn Hills17,304
| 18–32
|- bgcolor="#ccffcc"
| 51
| February 5
| @ Milwaukee
| 
| Tracy McGrady (20)
| Tayshaun Prince (11)
| Will Bynum (4)
| Bradley Center15,791
| 19–32
|- bgcolor="#ffcccc"
| 52
| February 8
| San Antonio
| 
| Will Bynum (21)
| Greg Monroe (13)
| Tracy McGrady,Rodney Stuckey (3)
| The Palace of Auburn Hills16,132
| 19–33
|- bgcolor="#ccffcc"
| 53
| February 9
| @ Cleveland
| 
| Rodney Stuckey (22)
| Ben Wallace (9)
| Will Bynum (7)
| Quicken Loans Arena19,475
| 20–33
|- bgcolor="#ffcccc"
| 54
| February 11
| Miami
| 
| Austin Daye (18)
| Ben Gordon (7)
| Will Bynum (5)
| The Palace of Auburn Hills22,076
| 20–34
|- bgcolor="#ffcccc"
| 55
| February 13
| Portland
| 
| Ben Gordon (18)
| Ben Wallace (8)
| Rodney Stuckey (7)
| The Palace of Auburn Hills15,257
| 20–35
|- bgcolor="#ffcccc"
| 56
| February 14
| Atlanta
| 
| Tracy McGrady (14)
| Ben Wallace (7)
| Will Bynum (7)
| The Palace of Auburn Hills11,844
| 20–36
|- bgcolor="#ccffcc"
| 57
| February 16
| Indiana
| 
| Tayshaun Prince (25)
| Tayshaun Prince (11)
| Will Bynum (7)
| The Palace of Auburn Hills12,551
| 21–36
|- align="center"
|colspan="9" bgcolor="#bbcaff"|All-Star Break 
|- bgcolor="#ffcccc"
| 58
| February 22
| Houston
| 
| Will Bynum (21)
| Greg Monroe (12)
| Will Bynum (6)
| The Palace of Auburn Hills12,353
| 21–37
|- bgcolor="#ffcccc"
| 59
| February 23
| @ Indiana
| 
| Greg Monroe (27)
| Greg Monroe (12)
| Tracy McGrady (12)
| Conseco Fieldhouse12,214
| 21–38
|- bgcolor="#ffcccc"
| 60
| February 25
| @ Philadelphia
| 
| Will Bynum (29)
| Greg Monroe (11)
| Will Bynum (6)
| Wells Fargo Center15,105
| 21–39
|- bgcolor="#ccffcc"
| 61
| February 26
| Utah
| 
| Rodney Stuckey (28)
| Greg Monroe (16)
| Will Bynum,Rodney Stuckey (8)
| The Palace of Auburn Hills18,564
| 22–39
|-

|- bgcolor="#ffcccc"
| 62
| March 1
| @ Milwaukee
| 
| Rodney Stuckey (25)
| Greg Monroe,Charlie Villanueva (9)
| Rodney Stuckey (5)
| Bradley Center11,364
| 22–40
|- bgcolor="#ffcccc"
| 63
| March 2
| Minnesota
| 
| Austin Daye (22)
| Greg Monroe (11)
| Rodney Stuckey (10)
| The Palace of Auburn Hills13,122
| 22–41
|- bgcolor="#ccffcc"
| 64
| March 6
| Washington
| 
| Tayshaun Prince (20)
| Greg Monroe,Rodney Stuckey (7)
| Rodney Stuckey (9)
| The Palace of Auburn Hills17,506
| 23–41
|- bgcolor="#ffcccc"
| 65
| March 9
| @ San Antonio
| 
| Richard Hamilton (20)
| Greg Monroe (10)
| Tracy McGrady (9)
| AT&T Center18,581
| 23–42
|- bgcolor="#ffcccc"
| 66
| March 11
| @ Oklahoma City
| 
| Richard Hamilton (20)
| Greg Monroe (10)
| Greg Monroe,Rodney Stuckey (6)
| Oklahoma City Arena18,203
| 23–43
|- bgcolor="#ffcccc"
| 67
| March 12
| @ Denver
| 
| Chris Wilcox (21)
| Austin Daye,Ben Gordon,Greg Monroe (6)
| Will Bynum (10)
| Pepsi Center19,155
| 23–44
|- bgcolor="#ccffcc"
| 68
| March 16
| Toronto
| 
| Richard Hamilton (24)
| Greg Monroe (10)
| Rodney Stuckey (14)
| The Palace of Auburn Hills15,166
| 24–44
|- bgcolor="#ccffcc"
| 69
| March 18
| New York
| 
| Tayshaun Prince (16)
| Chris Wilcox (12)
| Will Bynum (5)
| The Palace of Auburn Hills22,076
| 25–44
|- bgcolor="#ffcccc"
| 70
| March 20
| @ Atlanta
| 
| Rodney Stuckey (22)
| Greg Monroe (10)
| Rodney Stuckey (8)
| Philips Arena17,580
| 25–45
|- bgcolor="#ffcccc"
| 71
| March 23
| Miami
| 
| Richard Hamilton (27)
| Greg Monroe (12)
| Rodney Stuckey (6)
| The Palace of Auburn Hills22,076
| 25–46
|- bgcolor="#ffcccc"
| 72
| March 25
| @ Cleveland
| 
| Richard Hamilton,Tayshaun Prince (15)
| Chris Wilcox,Greg Monroe (8)
| Rodney Stuckey (4)
| Quicken Loans Arena19,907
| 25–47
|- bgcolor="#ccffcc"
| 73
| March 26
| Indiana
| 
| Richard Hamilton (23)
| Greg Monroe (13)
| Richard Hamilton,Rodney Stuckey (6)
| The Palace of Auburn Hills19,216
| 26–47
|- bgcolor="#ffcccc"
| 74
| March 30
| @ Indiana
| 
| Rodney Stuckey (24)
| Greg Monroe (9)
| Rodney Stuckey (9)
| Conseco Fieldhouse9,390
| 26–48
|-

|- bgcolor="#ffcccc"
| 75
| April 1
| Chicago
| 
| Richard Hamilton (30)
| Greg Monroe (9)
| Tayshaun Prince (6)
| The Palace of Auburn Hills22,076
| 26–49
|- bgcolor="#ffcccc"
| 76
| April 3
| @ Boston
| 
| Will Bynum (20)
| Greg Monroe,Charlie Villanueva,Chris Wilcox (5)
| Richard Hamilton,Greg Monroe (5)
| TD Garden18,624
| 26–50
|- bgcolor="#ffcccc"
| 77
| April 5
| @ Washington
| 
| Greg Monroe (22)
| Greg Monroe (14)
| Tracy McGrady (6)
| Verizon Center18,131
| 26–51
|- bgcolor="#ccffcc"
| 78
| April 6
| New Jersey
| 
| Richard Hamilton (25)
| Greg Monroe (10)
| Rodney Stuckey (10)
| The Palace of Auburn Hills14,554
| 27–51
|- bgcolor="#ccffcc"
| 79
| April 8
| Milwaukee
| 
| Chris Wilcox (27)
| Chris Wilcox (13)
| Richard Hamilton (6)
| The Palace of Auburn Hills16,266
| 28–51
|- bgcolor="#ccffcc"
| 80
| April 10
| @ Charlotte
| 
| Rodney Stuckey (24)
| Greg Monroe (9)
| Rodney Stuckey (11)
| Time Warner Cable Arena16,234
| 29–51
|- bgcolor="#ffcccc"
| 81
| April 11
| Cleveland
| 
| Rodney Stuckey (29)
| Jason Maxiell (14)
| Rodney Stuckey (14)
| The Palace of Auburn Hills15,589
| 29–52
|- bgcolor="#ccffcc"
| 82
| April 13
| @ Philadelphia
| 
| Rodney Stuckey (29)
| Greg Monroe (13)
| Rodney Stuckey (8)
| Wells Fargo Center13,760
| 30–52
|-

Player statistics

Season

|- align="center" bgcolor=""
|  || 61 || 5 || 18.4 || .448 || .320 || .836 || 1.2 || 3.2 || 0.9 || 0.1 || 7.9
|- align="center" bgcolor="#f0f0f0"
|  || 72 || 16 || 20.1 || .410 || .401 || .759 || 3.8 || 1.1 || 0.5 || 0.5 || 7.5 
|- align="center" bgcolor=""
|  || style="background:#eb003c;color:white;" | 82 || 27 || 26.0 || .440 || .402 || .850 || 2.4 || 2.1 || 0.6 || 0.2 || 11.2
|- align="center" bgcolor="#f0f0f0"
|  || 55 || 39 || 27.2 || .429 || .382 || .849 || 2.3 || 3.1 || 0.7 || 0.1 || 14.1
|- align="center" bgcolor=""
|  || 57 || 14 || 16.3 || .492 || .0 || .515 || 3.0 || 0.3 || 0.4 || 0.4 || 4.2
|- align="center" bgcolor="#f0f0f0"
|  || 72 || 39 || 23.4 || .442 || .341 || .698 || 3.5 || 3.5 || 0.9 || 0.5 || 8.0
|- align="center" bgcolor=""
|  || 80 || 48 || 27.8 || .551 || .0 || .622 || style="background:#eb003c;color:white;" | 7.5 || 1.3 || style="background:#eb003c;color:white;" | 1.2 || 0.6 || 9.4
|- align="center" bgcolor="#f0f0f0"
|  || 78 || style="background:#eb003c;color:white;" | 78 || style="background:#eb003c;color:white;" | 32.8 || .473 || .347 || .702 || 4.2 || 2.8 || 0.4 || 0.5 || 14.1
|- align="center" bgcolor=""
|  || 70 || 54 || 31.2 || .439 || .289 || style="background:#eb003c;color:white;" | .866 || 3.1 || style="background:#eb003c;color:white;" | 5.2 || 1.1 || 0.1 || style="background:#eb003c;color:white;" | 15.5
|- align="center" bgcolor="#f0f0f0"
|  || 22 || 1 || 9.0 || .406 || .429 || .450 || 0.5 || 0.1 || 0.1 || .0 || 3.4
|- align="center" bgcolor=""
|  || 76 || 11 || 21.9 || .442 || .387 || .767 || 3.9 || 0.6 || 0.6 || 0.6 || 11.1
|- align="center" bgcolor="#f0f0f0"
|  || 54 || 49 || 22.9 || .450 || style="background:#eb003c;color:white;" | .500 || .333 || 6.5 || 1.3 || 1.0 || style="background:#eb003c;color:white;" | 1.0 || 2.9
|- align="center" bgcolor=""
|  || 57 || 29 || 17.5 || style="background:#eb003c;color:white;" | .581 || .000 || .562 || 4.8 || 0.8 || 0.5 || 0.3 || 7.4

Additions

Subtractions

References

Detroit Pistons seasons
Detroit
Detroit
Detroit